This is a list of châteaux in Rhône-Alpes, France.

Ain
Château des Allymes, in Ambérieu-en-Bugey
Château d'Ambérieux-en-Dombes in Ambérieux-en-Dombes
Château d'Andert in Andert-et-Condon
Château d'Anglefort in Anglefort
Chartreuse d'Arvières in Lochieu  (ruin)
Château de la Barre in Brégnier-Cordon
Château de la Bâtie in Montceaux
Château de Beaumont in Saint-Étienne-sur-Chalaronne
Château de Beauregard in Beauregard
Château de Beauretour in Saint-Germain-les-Paroisses
Château de Bouligneux in Bouligneux
Château du Breuil, in Monthieux
Château de La Bruyère in Saint-Bernard
Château de Chanay in Chanay
Château de Champdor in Champdor
Château de Chanoz-Châtenay in Chanoz-Châtenay
Château de Châtillon-sur-Chalaronne in Châtillon-sur-Chalaronne (ruin)
Château de Chavagneux in Genouilleux
Château de Chazey-sur-Ain in Chazey-sur-Ain
Château de Cillery in Jassans-Riottier
Château de Coiselet in Matafelon-Granges
Château de Corcelles in Trévoux
Château de Cordon in Brégnier-Cordon
Château de Divonne, in Divonne-les-Bains
Château de Dortan in Dortan
Château de la Dorches in Chanay
Château des Eclaz in Cheignieu-la-Balme
Fort l'Écluse, in Léaz
Château de Fétan in Trévoux
Château de Fléchères, in Fareins
Château de Genoud in Certines
Château de Grilly in Grilly
Château de Groslée in Groslée
Château d' Honoré d' Urfé in Virieu-le-Grand
Château de Jasseron in Jasseron
Domaine de Joyeux in Joyeux
Château de Juis in Savigneux
Château de Longes in Sulignat
Château de Loriol in Confrançon
Château de Loyes in Villieu-Loyes-Mollon
Château de Machuraz in Vieu
Château de Mareste in Chavannes-sur-Reyssouze
Château de Meillonnas in Meillonnas
Chartreuse de Meyriat in Vieu-d'Izenave  (ruin)
Château de Montbriand in Messimy-sur-Saône
Château de Montferrand in Lagnieu
Château de Montgriffon in Montgriffon (ruin)
Chartreuse de Montmerle in Lescheroux
Château de Montplaisant in Montagnat
Château de Montribloud in Saint-André-de-Corcy
Château de Montveran in Culoz
Château de Pennesuyt, also known as Château de Loëze, in Bourg-en-Bresse
Chartreuse de Pierre-Châtel in Virignin
Château de Poncin in Poncin
Château de Pont-d'Ain in Pont-d'Ain
Château de Pont-de-Veyle in Pont-de-Veyle
Chartreuse de Portes in Bénonces
Château de Richemont in Villette-sur-Ain
Château du Roquet in Trévoux
Château de Rossillon in Rossillon
Château de Rougemont in Aranc (ruin)
Château de Saint-André in Briord
Château-Fort de Saint-Bernard in Saint-Bernard
Château de Saint-Denis-en-Bugey in Saint-Denis-en-Bugey
Château de Saint-Didier-de-Formans in Saint-Didier-de-Formans
Château de Saint-Paul-de-Varax in Saint-Paul-de-Varax
Château de Sainte-Julie in Sainte-Julie
Château de Saix in Péronnas
Chartreuse de Sélignac in Simandre-sur-Suran
Château de la Serraz in Seillonnaz
Château de Thol in Neuville-sur-Ain
Château de la Tour in Neuville-sur-Ain
Château de la Tour-des-Echelles in Jujurieux
Château de Trévoux in Trévoux
Château de Varambon in Varambon
Château de Varey in Saint-Jean-le-Vieux
Château de Voltaire in Ferney-Voltaire

Ardèche 

Château d'Alba-la-Romaine in Alba-la-Romaine
Château d'Arras-sur-Rhône, in Arras-sur-Rhône  (ruin)
Château d'Aubenas in Aubenas  (château fort) (renaissance)
Château de Balazuc in Balazuc
Château de Banne in Banne  (ruin)
Château de Bayard in Bogy
Château de Beaume in Saint-André-en-Vivarais
Château de Beaumefort in Saint-Alban-Auriolles
Château de Berzème in Berzème
Château de Bessas in Bessas
Château de Bessin in Gilhoc-sur-Ormèze
Château de Blou in Thueyts
Chartreuse de Bonnefoy in Le Béage  (ruin)
Château des Boscs in Gilhoc-sur-Ormèze
Château du Bosquet in Saint-Martin-d'Ardèche
Château de Boulogne in Saint-Michel-de-Boulogne  (ruin)
Château du Bousquet in Saint-Laurent-du-Pape
Château de Boze in Bozas
Château de Brénieux in Saint-Romain-d'Ay
Tour de Brison in Sanilhac
Château de Brison in Sanilhac  (ruin)
Château de Bruget in Jaujac
Château de Cachard in Boffres
Château de Castrevieille in jaujac
Château des Célestins in Colombier-le-Cardinal
Château de Chadenac in Thueyts  (ruin)
Château de Chambonas in Chambonas
Château de Chapdenac in Barnas  (ruin)
Château de Charbonnel in Vinezac
Château de Chassagnes in Les Vans
Château du Chastelas in Grospierres  (ruin)
Donjon de Chastelas in Jaujac  (ruin)
Château Le Chatelas in Saint-Thomé
Château de Châteaubourg in Châteaubourg
Château de Chazotte in Arlebosc
Château de La Chèze au Cheylard
Château de Chirol in Saint-Victor
Château de Clavières in Saint-Agrève
Château Clément in Vals-les-Bains
Château de Colombier-le-Cardinal in Colombier-le-Cardinal
Château de Colombier-le-Vieux in Colombier-le-Vieux
Château de Corsas in Saint-Victor
Château de Craux in Genestelle
Château de Crozat in Alboussière
Château de Cruas in Cruas
Château de Crussol in Saint-Péray   (château fort) (ruin)
Château de Déomas in Annonay
Château de Désaignes in Désaignes
Château de Devesset in Devesset
Château de Dol in Gilhoc-sur-Ormèze
Château Durtail in Châteaubourg
Château d'Ebbo in Vallon-Pont-d'Arc
Château d'Entrevaux in Saint-Priest
Château des Faugs in Boffres
Château de La Faurie in Saint-Alban-d'Ay
Château de Fontager in Saint-Romain-d'Ay
Château de Fontblachère in Saint-Lager-Bressac
Château des Genêts in Annonay
Château de Gerlande in Vanosc  (ruin)
Château de La Gorce in Lagorce  (ruin)
Château de Gourdan in Saint-Clair
Château de Grozon in Saint-Barthélemy-Grozon
Château de Guignebert in Saint-Martin-de-Valamas
Château de Hautségure in Meyras
Château de Hautvillars in Silhac
Château de Hauteville in Saint-Laurent-du-Pape
Château d'Iserand in Sécheras  (ruin)
Château de Joannas in Joannas
Domaine de Joviac in Rochemaure
Château de Joyeuse in Joyeuse (renaissance)
Château Julien in Vinezac
Château Lacour in Saint-Agrève
Château de Lafarge in Viviers
Château de Lagorce in Lagorce  (ruin)
Château de Largentière in Largentière
Château de Larque in Banne
Château Laurent in Arcens
Château des Lèbres in Banne
Château de Liviers in Lyas
Château de Logères in Joannas
Château de Mahun in Saint-Symphorien-de-Mahun  (ruin)
Château de Maisonseule in Saint-Basile
Château de Malet in Largentière
Château de Malgaray in Arlebosc
Château de Manoha in Ardoix
Château de Mars in Boulieu-lès-Annonay
Château Maza au Cheylard
Château de Mirabel in Mirabel  (ruin)
Château de Montanet in Peaugres
Château de Montivert in Saint-André-en-Vivarais
Château de Montréal in Montréal
Château de La Motte in Accons
Château de La Motte in Chassiers
Château de Munas in Ardoix
Château de la Mure in Peaugres
Château de l'Ourse in Viviers  (ruin)
Château de Pampelonne in Saint-Martin-sur-Lavezon
Château Perier in Boffres
Château de Peychelard in Lamastre  (ruin)
Château de Pierregourde in Gilhac-et-Bruzac  (ruin)
Château de Pierregrosse in Saint-Alban-d'Ay
Château du Pin in Fabras
Château du Plantier in Saint-Alban-d'Ay
Château de Pourrat in Davézieux
Château de Pourcheyrolles in Montpezat-sous-Bauzon  (ruin)
Château des Prés in Ozon
Château de Pugnères in Joannas
Château de Retourtour in Lamastre  (ruin)
Château des Rieux in Saint-Alban-d'Ay
Château de La Rivoire in Vanosc
Château de La Roche in Mirabel  (ruin)
Château de Rochebloine in Nozières  (ruin)
Château de Rochebonne in Saint-Martin-de-Valamas  (ruin)
Château de Rochecolombe in Bourg-Saint-Andéol 
Château de Rochefort in Saint-Félicien  (ruin)
Château de Rochemaure in Rochemaure
Château de Rochemure in Jaujac
Château de Rochemure in Ailhon
Château de Rocher in Rocher
Château de Rochessauve in Rochessauve
Château des Romaneaux in Arlebosc
Château de Rosières in Saint-Félicien
Château des Roure in Labastide-de-Virac
Château de Ruissas in Colombier-le-Vieux
Château de Saint-Montan in Saint-Montan
Château de Saint-Sylvestre in Saint-Sylvestre
Château de Saint-Thomé in Saint-Thomé
Château de Sampzon in Sampzon
Château de Satillieu in Satillieu
Château des Sauvages in Désaignes
Château du Scipionnet in Les Vans
Château de la Selve in Grospierres 
Château de Semoline in Prunet
Château de Seray in Préaux  (ruin)
Château de Solignac in Gilhoc-sur-Ormèze  (ruin)
Château de Soras in Saint-Cyr
Château de Soubeyran in Saint-Barthélemy-Grozon
Château de Tauriers in Tauriers
Château de Thorrenc in Thorrenc
Château de La Tourette in Vernoux-en-Vivarais  (ruin)
Château de Tournay in Beauvène
Château de Tournon in Tournon-sur-Rhône
Château d'Urbillac in Lamastre
Château de Vaussèche in Vernoux-en-Vivarais
Château de Vallon-Pont-d'Arc in Vallon-Pont-d'Arc
Château de Ventadour in Meyras  (château fort)
Château du Vergier in Désaignes
Château de La Vernade in Chassiers
Château de Versas in Sanilhac  (renaissance)
Château de Vinsas in Bourg-Saint-Andéol 
Château de Vocance in Vocance
Château de Vogüé in Vogüé  (château fort)
Château de la Voulte-sur-Rhône in La Voulte-sur-Rhône

Drôme 

Château des Adhémar, in Montélimar  (château fort)
Château d'Albon, in Albon   (ruin)
Château d'Allan, in Allan  (ruin)
Château d'Aulan, in Aulan
Château de Barral, in Hauterives
Château de Beausemblant, in Beausemblant
Château La Borie, in Suze-la-Rousse 
Château de la Bretonnière, in Mureils
Château de Chamaret, in Chamaret  (ruin)
Château de Charmes, in Charmes-sur-l'Herbasse
Château de Châteaudouble, in Châteaudouble
Château du Châtelard, in Hauterives
Château de Collonges, in Saint-Donat-sur-l'Herbasse
Tour de Crest, in Crest  (château fort)
Château de Eurre, in Eurre
Château des évêques de Valence, in Montvendre
Château de Grignan, in Grignan  (château fort) (renaissance)
Château de Hauterives, in Hauterives
Château de Joyeuse, in Lapeyrouse-Mornay
Château de Laval-d'Aix, in Laval-d'Aix  (ruin)
Château du Molard, in Beausemblant
Château de Montchenu, in Montchenu
Château de la Pérouze, in Saint-Sorlin-en-Valloire
Château de Poët-laval, in Le Poët-Laval
Tour de Ratières, in Ratières  (ruin)
Château de Rochechinard, in Rochechinard  (ruin)
Château de Rochegude, in Rochegude
Château de Rochefort-en-Valdaine, in Rochefort-en-Valdaine  (ruin)
Château de La Rolière, in Livron-sur-Drôme 
Château Rompu, in Châteaudouble
Château de Sauzet, in Sauzet
Château de Suze-la-Rousse, in Suze-la-Rousse  (château fort) (renaissance)
Chartreuse du Val-Sainte-Marie de Bouvante, in Bouvante  (ruin)

Isère 

Château de Pupetières, in Châbons
Château des Archevêques, in Seyssuel  (ruin)
Château de l'Arthaudière, in Saint-Bonnet-de-Chavagne
Château de la Balme, in Murinais
Château de la Bâtie, in Vienne   (ruin)
Château Bayard, in Pontcharra
Château de Bon repos, in Jarrie
Château de Bressieux, in Bressieux   (ruin)
Manoir de Le Cheylas, in Le Cheylas
Château du Cingle, in Vernas
Château de Crémieu, in Crémieu
Château de Demptezieu, in Saint-Savin
Château de Fallavier, in Saint-Quentin-Fallavier  (château fort)
Château de Jarcieu, in Jarcieu
Château de Longpra, in Saint-Geoire-en-Valdaine
Château de Moidière, in Bonnefamille
Château de Montbreton, in Chanas
Château de Montfort, in Crolles  (ruin)
Château de Montseveroux, in Montseveroux
Chartreuse de Parménie, in Beaucroissant
Château du Passage, au Passage
Chartreuse de Prémol, in Vaulnaveys-le-Haut  (ruin)
Château de Rives, in Rives
Château de Roussillon, in Roussillon
Château de Sassenage, in Sassenage
Château de Septème, in Septème
Château de la Sône, in La Sône
Château du Touvet, au Touvet
Château d'Uriage-les-Bains, in Uriage-les-Bains
Château de Virieu, in Virieu
Château de Vizille, in Vizille
Grande Chartreuse in Saint-Pierre-de-Chartreuse

Loire 

Château de la Bastie d'Urfé, in Saint-Étienne-le-Molard
Château de Bonson, in Bonson
Château de Bouthéon, in Andrézieux-Bouthéon
Château des Bruneaux, in Firminy
Château de Chalmazel, in Chalmazel
Château de Couzan, in Sail-sous-Couzan  (ruin)
Château d'Essalois, in Chambles
Château de Grangent, in Saint-Just-Saint-Rambert
Château de Matel, in Roanne
Château de la Merlée, in Saint-Just-Saint-Rambert
Château de Montrond, in Montrond-les-Bains
Château de la Péguette, in Saint-Just-Saint-Rambert
Château de la Roche, in Saint-Priest-la-Roche
Château de Rochetaillée, in Saint-Étienne  (ruin)
Chartreuse de Sainte-Croix-en-Jarez, in Sainte-Croix-en-Jarez
Château d'Urfé, in Saint-Marcel-d'Urfé  (ruin)
Château de Pommiers-en-Forez, in Pommiers-en-Forez

Rhône 

Château d'Albigny, Albigny-sur-Saône
Château d'Arginy, Charentay
Château de la Bachasse, in Sainte-Foy-lès-Lyon
Château de Bagnols, in Bagnols
Château de la Barollière, Limonest
Château des Bassieux, Anse
Château de Beauregard, Saint-Genis-Laval
Château de Bionnay, Lacenas
Château de Bois Dieu, Lissieu
Maison forte de Bron, Bron
Château de La Bussière, Oullins
Château de La Carelle, Ouroux
Château des Cartières, Chaponost
Château de la Chaize, Odenas
Château de Chamelet, Chamelet
Château des Chances, Haies
Château de Charly, Charly
Château de Charnay, Charnay
Château de Chassagny, Chassagny
Château de Châtillon, Châtillon
Château de Chazay, Chazay-d'Azergues
Château de Chessy, Chessy
Château de la Combe, Irigny
Château de Corcelles-en-Beaujolais, Corcelles-en-Beaujolais
Château de Courbeville, Chessy
Château de Cruzol, Lentilly
Château de l'Éclair, Liergues
Maison forte d'Épeisses, Vourles
Château de la Flachère, Saint-Vérand
Château de la Fontaine, Anse
Château de Foudras, Charly
Château de Francheville, Francheville
Château du Grand Perron, Pierre-Bénite
Maison forte des Grand'Maisons, Cogny
Château d'Irigny, Irigny
Maison forte de l'Izérable, Morancé
Château de Janzé, Marcilly-d'Azergues
Château de Jarnioux, Jarnioux
Château du Jonchay, Anse
Château de Joux, in Joux
Château de Lacroix-Laval, Marcy-l'Étoile
Château de Lissieu, Lissieu
Château de Longchêne, Saint-Genis-Laval
Château de Lumagne, Saint-Genis-Laval
Château de Machy, Chasselay
Château de Ménival, Lyon
Château de Montauzan, Lacenas
Château de Montmelas, Montmelas-Saint-Sorlin
Château de la Motte, Lyon
Château de Noailleux, Cailloux-sur-Fontaines
Donjon d'Oingt, Oingt
Manoir de Parsonge, Dardilly
Château-Perret, Collonges-au-Mont-d'Or
Château du Petit Perron, Pierre-Bénite
Maison forte du Pin, Morancé
Château de Pramenoux, Lamure-sur-Azergues
Maison forte de Pravieux, Chaponost
Château de Pusignan, Pusignan
Château de Rapetour, Theizé
Château de la Roche Jullié
Château de Rochebonne, Theizé
Château de Rochetaillée-sur-Saône, Rochetaillée-sur-Saône
Château de Ronno, Ronno
Château de Saint-Cyr, Saint-Cyr-au-Mont-d'Or
Château de Saint-Priest, Saint-Priest
Château de Saint-Trys, Anse
Château de Sans-Souci, Limonest
Château du Sou, Lacenas
Château de Ternand, Ternand
Château de Thizy, Thizy
Château de La Tour, Saint-Genis-Laval
Château du Tourvéon, Collonges-au-Mont-d'Or
Château de la Trolanderie, Curis-au-Mont-d'Or
Château du Vivier, Écully
Maison Forte de Vourles, Vourles

Savoie 

 Manoir Aigueblanche, Aigueblanche
 Chartreuse d'Aillon, Aillon-le-Jeune
 Château de la Bâthie, La Bâthie
 Château de La Bâtie-Seyssel, Barby
 Château de Beaufort, Beaufort-sur-Doron
 Château de Bonport, Tresserve
 Château de Bourdeau, Bourdeau
 Château de Briançon, La Léchère
 Château de Buisson-Rond Barberaz
 Château de Caramagne Chambéry
 Château de Chambéry, Chambéry
 Château de Charbonnières, Aiguebelle  (ruin)
 Château de Châtillon Chindrieux
 Château de Chevron Mercury
 Château de Cornillon, Césarches or Queige
 Château de la Croix, Saint-Alban-Leysse
 Château d'Épierre, Épierre  (ruin)
 Château de Feissons, Feissons-sur-Isère
 Château de La Forest, Saint-Jean-de-Chevelu
 Tour Gaillarde, in Plancherine
 Château de Longefan, La Biolle
 Château de Lucey, Lucey
 Château des Marches, Les Marches
 Château de Miolans Saint-Pierre-d'Albigny
 Château de Montcharvin, Cognin
 Château de Montfalcon, La Biolle
 Château des Outards, Beaufort-sur-Doron
 Château de la Roche du Roi, Aix-les-Bains
 Château de Sainte-Hélène-sur-Isère, Sainte-Hélène-sur-Isère
 Château de Saint-Innocent, Brison-Saint-Innocent
 Château de La Salle (or La Sallaz),  Beaufort-sur-Doron
 Château de Somont, Yenne
 Château Thomas II, Le Bourget-du-Lac (ruin)
 Château de Tournon, Tournon

Haute-Savoie 

Château d'Aléry, Cran-Gevrier
Château d'Alex, Alex
Château d'Allamand, Lugrin
Château-Neuf d'Allinges, Allinges
Château-Vieux d'Allinges, Allinges
Château d'Annecy, Annecy
Château d'Arcine, Clarafond-Arcine
Château des Avenières, Cruseilles
Château d'Avully, Brenthonne
Château de La Balme, La Balme-de-Sillingy
Château de La Balme, Choisy
Château de Barbey, Mieussy
Château du Barrioz, Argonay
Château de Bassy, Bassy
Château de la Bâtie, La Balme-de-Sillingy
Château de Baudry, Arthaz-Pont-Notre-Dame
Château de Beauregard, Chens-sur-Léman
Château de Beauregard, Saint-Jeoire-en-Faucigny
Tour de Beauvivier, Doussard
Château de Beccon, Cruseilles
Tour de Bellecombe, Reignier
Tour de Bellegarde, Magland
Château du Bérouze, Samoëns
Maison forte de La Biolle, Thusy
Maison forte de Blanly, Saint-Félix
Château de Blonay, Marin
Château de Boëge, Boëge
Château de Boisy, Ballaison
Château de Boisy, Groisy
Château de Bonneville, Bonneville
Maison forte Le Bouchet, Thusy
Château de Bougé, Fillinges
Château de Bourbonges, Cordon
Château de Brens, Bons-en-Chablais
Château de Buffavent, Lully
Château de Cernex, Cernex
Manoir Chappuis, Douvaine
Château de Charansonnay, Massingy
Maison forte de Charrière, Thusy
Châteauvieux, Alby-sur-Chéran
Châteauvieux, Seynod
Château de Châtel, Usinens
Château du Châtelard de Feigères, Feigères
Château du Châtelard-en-Semine, Franclens
Château de Châtillon-sur-Cluses, Châtillon-sur-Cluses
Château de Chaumont, Chaumont
Château de Chavaroche, Chavanod
Maison forte de Chilly, Douvaine
Château de Chitry, Vallières
Château de Choisy, Choisy
Maison forte de Chounaz, Saint-Jeoire-en-Faucigny
Château de Chuet, Saint-Pierre-en-Faucigny
Château comtal de Clermont, Clermont en Genevois (ruin)
Clos Ruphy, Saint-Jeoire-en-Faucigny
Château de Cohendier, Saint-Pierre-en-Faucigny
Château Collonges, Hauteville-sur-Fier
Château des Contamines, Menthonnex-sous-Clermont
Château de Conzié, Bloye
Château de Cormand, La Côte-d'Hyot
Château de Cormand, Saint-Jeoire-en-Faucigny
Maison forte de Coucy, Chilly
Château de Coudrée, Sciez
Château de la Cour, Annecy-le-Vieux
Châtelet du Crédoz, Cornier
Château de la Croix, Chavanod
Château de Cruseilles, Cruseilles
Maison forte de Cursinges, Perrignier
Château de Dhéré or château d'Héré, Duingt
Château de Dingy, Dingy-Saint-Clair
Château de Disonche, Sallanches
Le Donjon, Alby-sur-Chéran
Maison forte de Doucy, Menthonnex-sous-Clermont
Château de Duingt or Château de Ruphy, or château de Châteauvieux, Duingt
Château comtal de Duingt, Faverges
Château de L'Echelle, La Roche-sur-Foron
Château d'Esery, Esery
Château d'Étrembières, Étrembières
Château de Faucigny, Faucigny
Château de Faverges, Faverges
Château de Fésigny, Cusy
Château de Folliet or du Feuillet, Alex
Château Foncet, Saint-Jeoire-en-Faucigny
Château de Foras, Menthonnex-sous-Clermont
Château le Foug or Château d'arbusigny, Arbusigny
Château de La Frasse, Sallanches
Château des Guillet-Monthoux, Thonon-les-Bains
Château de Gye, Giez
Château d'Habère-Lullin, Habère-Lullin
Palais de l'Ile, Annecy
Tour de Langin, Bons-en-Chablais
Château de Larringes, Larringes
Château de Lathuile, Lathuile
Maison forte de Loche, Magland
Château de Loëx, Bonne
Château de Lornay, Lornay
Château de Magny, Reignier
Château de Malbuisson, Copponex
Château de Marclaz, Thonon-les-Bains
Tour de Marignan, Sciez
Château de Marlioz, Marlioz
Château de Maxilly, Maxilly
Chartreuse de Mélan, Taninges
Château de Menthon, Menthon-Saint-Bernard
Château de Metz, Metz-Tessy
Château de Mieudry, Boussy
Maison forte de Mionnaz, Menthonnex-sous-Clermont
Château de Montconon, Alby-sur-Chéran
Château de Montdésir, Alby-sur-Chéran
Château de Montfort, Archamps
Château de Monthouz, Pringy
Château de Montpon, Alby-sur-Chéran
Château de Montrottier, Lovagny
Château de Montvuagnard, Alby-sur-Chéran
Château de Morgenex, Vallières
Château de Mortery, Menthonnex-sous-Clermont
Château de Nernier, Nernier
Château de Novel, Annecy
Château de Novéry, Minzier
Château des Onges, Hauteville-sur-Fier
Château d'Orlyé, Seynod
Château de Pelly, Desingy
Château de Périaz, Seynod
Château de la Pérollière, Cran-Gevrier
Château de la Pesse, Annecy-le-Vieux
Château de Pierrecharve, Mûres
Château de Pieuillet, Marcellaz-Albanais
Maison forte de Planchamp, Thusy
Château de Pollinge, Essert-Salève
Chartreuse de Pomier, Présilly
Château de Pontex, Viry
Château de Pontverre, Cruseilles
Château de La Poype, Ternier
Château de Premery, Pringy
Château de Quincy, Massongy
Château de Quintal, Quintal
Chartreuse du Reposoir, Le Reposoir
Château de Ripaille, Thonon-les-Bains
Château de La Roche-sur-Foron, La Roche-sur-Foron
Château de la Rochette, Lully (ruin)
Château de Rossy, Choisy
Château de La Ruaz, Veyrier-du-Lac
Château des Rubins, Sallanches
Château de Rumilly or Château des Montfort, Rumilly
Château de Rumilly-sous-Cornillon or Château d'Arcine, Saint-Pierre-en-Faucigny
Château de Saint-Marcel, Marigny-Saint-Marcel
Château Saint-Michel d'Avully, Brenthonne
Château de Saint-Sixt, Saint-Sixt
Fort de Sainte-Catherine, Viry
Château du Saix, La Roche-sur-Foron
Château de Salagine, Bloye
Château de Sales, Thorens-Glières
Château de Sallenôves, Marlioz
Maison forte de La Sauffaz, in Saint-Félix
Château de Seyssel, Seyssel
Château du Sougey, Arbusigny
Château de Ternier, Ternier
Château de Thairy, Thairy
Château de Thénières, Ballaison
Château de Thiollaz, Chaumont
Château de Thorens, Thorens-Glières
Château de Thuyset, Thonon-les-Bains
Château de la Tour, Desingy
Château de la Tour, Samoëns
Château de la Tour, Vulbens
Château de Tourronde, Lugrin
Château des Tours, Ayse
Château de Trésum, Annecy
Château de Troches, Douvaine
Château de Vens, Seyssel
Château de Verboz, Clarafond
Château de Villard-Chabod, Saint-Jorioz
Château de Villy, Contamine-sur-Arve
Château de Villy, Reignier
Château de Viry, Viry
Château du Vivier, Scientrier
Château de Vons, Marigny-Saint-Marcel
Château de Vulbens, Vulbens
Château d'Yvoire, Yvoire

Notes and references 

 Jean Mesqui, Châteaux forts et fortifications en France, Éd. Flammarion.
 Charles-Laurent Salch, Dictionnaire des châteaux et des fortifications du moyen âge en France, Éd. Publitotal.

Department of Savoie

See also
 List of castles in France

 Rhone-Alpes